1382 Gerti, provisional designation , is a Florian asteroid from the inner regions of the asteroid belt, approximately 10 kilometers in diameter. It was discovered on 21 January 1925, by astronomer Karl Reinmuth at the Heidelberg-Königstuhl State Observatory in southwest Germany. The asteroid was named after a secretary of the Astronomical Calculation Institute, Gertrud Höhne.

Orbit and classification 

Gerti has been dynamically classified as a member of the Flora family, a giant asteroid family and the largest family of stony asteroids in the main-belt. It is, however, a non-family asteroid of the main belt's background population when applying the Hierarchical Clustering Method to its proper orbital elements (both by Nesvorný as well as by Novakovic, Knežević and Milani).

It orbits the Sun in the inner main-belt at a distance of 1.9–2.5 AU once every 3 years and 4 months (1,208 days). Its orbit has an eccentricity of 0.13 and an inclination of 2° with respect to the ecliptic. The body's observation arc begins with its official discovery observation at Heidelberg in January 1925.

Physical characteristics 

The LCDB assumes it to be a stony S-type asteroid, due to its dynamical classification as a member of the Flora family.

Rotation period 

Two rotational lightcurve of Gerti were obtained from photometric observations by Wiesław Wiśniewski in February 1988, and by astronomers at the Palomar Transient Factory in January 2011, respectively. Lightcurve analysis gave an identical rotation period of 3.082 hours with a respective brightness amplitude of 0.20 and 0.29 magnitude. A third lightcurve by René Roy in March 2008 gave a period of 3.0 hours with an amplitude of 0.36 magnitude.

Poles 

In 2011, a modeled lightcurve using data from the Uppsala Asteroid Photometric Catalogue and other sources gave a concurring sidereal period of 3.081545 hours, as well as two spin axis of (268.0°, 23.0°) and (87.0°, 28.0°) in ecliptic coordinates (λ, β).

Diameter and albedo 

According to the surveys carried out by the Japanese Akari satellite and the NEOWISE mission of NASA's Wide-field Infrared Survey Explorer, Gerti measures between 9.14 and 11.94 kilometers in diameter and its surface has an albedo between 0.196 and 0.28.

The Collaborative Asteroid Lightcurve Link assumes an albedo of 0.24 – taken from 8 Flora, the Flora family's parent body – and derives a diameter of 8.54 kilometers based on an absolute magnitude of 12.51.

Naming 

This minor planet was named after Gertrud Höhne who was a secretary at the Berlin Astronomical Calculation Institute (. The official naming citation was mentioned in The Names of the Minor Planets by Paul Herget in 1955.

References

External links 
 Asteroid Lightcurve Database (LCDB), query form (info )
 Dictionary of Minor Planet Names, Google books
 Asteroids and comets rotation curves, CdR – Observatoire de Genève, Raoul Behrend
 Discovery Circumstances: Numbered Minor Planets (1)-(5000) – Minor Planet Center
 
 

001382
Discoveries by Karl Wilhelm Reinmuth
Named minor planets
19250121